Manuel Planchart (born 4 October 1942) is a Venezuelan sprinter. He competed in the men's 100 metres at the 1968 Summer Olympics.

References

External links
 

1942 births
Living people
Athletes (track and field) at the 1968 Summer Olympics
Venezuelan male sprinters
Olympic athletes of Venezuela
Place of birth missing (living people)
20th-century Venezuelan people